This is the order of battle for the Battle of Guadalajara during the Spanish Civil War.

Nationalists
 División Soria – General José Moscardó
 I Brigade – Colonel Esteban Infantes (4,800 men employed in the Somosierra)
 II Brigade – Colonel Marzo
 1st Agrupación – Lieutenant Colonel Sotelo
 Battalion de América
 Battalion Bailén
 Battalion Toledo
 Battalion La Victoria
 1 Compañía de carros
 1 Artillery Group 75mm
 2 Sections of Antitank Guns and antiaircraft 20mm,
 1 Combat Engineer and Services Company
 2nd Agrupación – Comandante Ibáñez de Aldecoa
 Battalion Gerona
 Tercio de Requetés de Burgos
 11th Bandera de Falange
 1 Artillery section 75mm
 1 Artillery Group 77mm
 1 Combat Engineer and Services Company
 3rd Agrupación – Lieutenant Colonel Villalba
 Battalion Aragón
 Battalion San Quintín
 1 Bandera de F. E. de Burgos-Alava
 1 Artillery battery 75mm
 1 Artillery battery 105mm
 1 Combat Engineer and Services Company
 Agrupación de Caballería – Comandante Pita Da Veiga
 4 escuadrones de sables y una sección de armas automáticas.
 Reserva del Mando
 1 Artillery battery 155mm
 1 Pontoonier Unit
 III Brigade – Colonel Los Arcos (sent to be a reserve, not involved in the battle)

Corpo Truppe Volontarie – General de División Mario Roatta
 4th Division "Littorio" (Lictor) – General de Brigada Annibale Bergonzoli
 1st CCNN Division "Dio lo Vuole" ("God wants it") – General de Brigada Edmondo Rossi
 2nd CCNN Division "Fiamme Nere" ("Black Flames") – General de Brigada Guido Amerigo Coppi
 XXIII de Marzo Group
 Attached artillery – Teniente Coronel Bottari
 X Group 75/27 (3 batteries of 4 guns)
 I Group 100/17 (2 batteries of 4 guns)
 II Group 100/17 (2 batteries of 4 guns)
 II Group 105/28 (2 batteries of 3 guns)
 IV Group 149/12 (2 batteries of 3 guns)
 Platoon of Combat Engineers
 Artillery Park Section
 3rd CCNN Division "Penne Nere" ("Black Feathers") – General de Brigada Luigi Nuvoloni
 Tank and Armoured Cars Group
 Corps Artillery – General de Brigada Ugo Zanotti
 VIII Group 75/27 (3 batteries of 4 guns)
 VII Group 75/27 (3 batteries of 4 guns)
 III Group 100/17 (2 batteries of 4 guns)
 IV Group 100/17 (2 batteries of 4 guns)
 V Group 100/17 (2 batteries of 4 guns)
 VI Group 100/17 (2 batteries of 4 guns)
 II Group 105/28 (2 batteries of 3 guns)
 IV Group 105/28 (2 batteries of 3 guns)
 I Group 149/12 (2 batteries of 3 guns)
 III Grupo de 149/12 (2 batteries of 3 guns)
 75mm Battery C.K.
 AA Battery 20mm
 Engineer Section
 Artillery Park Section
 Engineer Group – General de Brigada Michele Molinari
 1 Mixed Company (vehicle repair)
 1 Radio and Signal Company
 Independent Radio and Signal unit
 Interception unit

Republicans
IV Army Corps – Lt. Col. Enrique Jurado Barrio
 11th Division – Enrique Líster
 12th Division –  (replaced by  after three days)
 14th Division – Cipriano Mera
 42nd Mixed Brigade (Flank guard)
 1st Mobile Brigade – Valentín González
 1st Battalion
 2nd Battalion
 3rd Battalion
 4th Battalion
 33rd Mixed Brigade – Comandante Mulet
 Batallón Teruel
 Batallón 1st de Mayo
 Batallón Madrid
 Batallón 11th Regiment
 Batallón 9th Regiment
 1st Cavalry Brigade – Comandante Aguado
 1st Regiment
 1st Squadron Group – Captain Jose Gonzalez Caparras
 2nd Squadron Group – Captain Isidoro Infantes Rico
 2nd Regiment "Jesus Hernandez" – Comandante Cruz
 Cavalry Squadron of the XII Mixed Brigade
 6 Fortification Battalions

References

Sources
 de Mesa, José Luis, El regreso de las legiones: (la ayuda militar italiana à la España nacional, 1936–1939), García Hispán, Granada:España, 1994 

Guadalajara
Battle of Guadalajara, Order